Stars is the fifth studio album by American singer Sylvester, released in 1979 on the Fantasy label.

Chart performance
The album peaked at No. 27 on the R&B albums chart. It also reached No. 63 on the Billboard 200. The album features a disco-styled cover version of Ben E. King's "I (Who Have Nothing)", which peaked at No. 27 on the Hot Soul Singles chart and No. 40 on the Billboard Hot 100. It also reached No. 4 on the Hot Dance Club Play chart along with the title track and "Body Strong".

Track listing

Charts
Album

Singles

References

External links

1979 albums
Sylvester (singer) albums
Albums produced by Harvey Fuqua
Fantasy Records albums